Born to Rock and Roll is a compilation album by the ex-Byrds frontman Roger McGuinn, released on Columbia Records in August 1991. It was issued following the success of McGuinn's comeback solo album Back from Rio earlier that same year. Born to Rock and Roll contains songs from all five of McGuinn's solo albums of the 1970s, released after the final breakup of The Byrds in 1973. It was the first time that material from these albums had been released on Compact Disc.

Track listing 
All tracks composed by Roger McGuinn and Jacques Levy except where otherwise noted.

 "I'm So Restless" – 3:07
 "My New Woman" – 2:36
 "Draggin'" – 3:38
 "The Water is Wide" (Traditional; arranged by Roger McGuinn) – 3:07
 Tracks 1-4 were originally released on Roger McGuinn (1973).
 "Same Old Sound" – 3:29
 Track 5 was originally released on Peace on You (1974).
 "Bag Full of Money" – 2:37
 Track 6 was originally released on Roger McGuinn (1973).
 "Gate of Horn" – 2:13
 "Peace On You" (Charlie Rich) – 4:04
 Tracks 7-8 were originally released on Peace on You (1974).
 "Lover of the Bayou" – 3:22
 Track 9 was originally released on Roger McGuinn & Band (1975)
 "Stone (The Lord Loves a Rolling Stone)" (Spooner Oldham, Dan Penn) – 3:03
 Track 10 was originally released on Roger McGuinn (1973).
 "Lisa" (McGuinn) – 2:00
 Track 11 was originally released on Roger McGuinn & Band (1975)
 "Take Me Away" – 3:01
 "Jolly Roger" – 4:58
 "Friend" (McGuinn) – 2:07
 "Dreamland" (Joni Mitchell) – 5:20
 Tracks 12-15 were originally released on Cardiff Rose (1976).
 "Dixie Highway" – 3:27
 "American Girl" (Tom Petty) – 4:28
 Tracks 16-17 were originally released on Thunderbyrd (1977).
 "Up to Me" (Bob Dylan) – 5:37
 Track 18 was originally released on Cardiff Rose (1976).
 "Russian Hill" – 5:06
 Track 19 was originally released on Thunderbyrd (1977).
 "Born to Rock and Roll" – 3:17
 Track 20 was originally released on Roger McGuinn & Band (1975)

Personnel 

 Vic Anesini – remastering
 Kristine Arnold – backing vocals
 Greg Attaway – drums
 Bruce Barlow – bass
 Hal Blaine – tambourine
 Richard Bowden – guitar
 John Boylan – producer
 Gene Clark – backing vocals
 Michael Clarke – drums
 David Crosby – backing vocals
 Donnie Dacus – rhythm guitar, backing vocals
 Don DeVito – producer
 Bob Dylan – harmonica
 Buddy Emmons – steel guitar
 Chris Ethridge – bass
 Dan Fogelberg – backing vocals
 Steve Forman – percussion
 Tim Geelan – remastering
 Marty Grebb – keyboards
 Paul Grupp – engineer
 John Guerin – drums
 Bill Halverson – producer
 Paul Harris – keyboards
 Charlie Harrison – bass, vocals
 Chris Hillman – backing Vocals
 Kim Hutchcroft – saxophone
 Bruce Johnston – backing vocals
 Jimmy Joyce – backing vocals
 Alex Kazanegras – engineer
 Russ Kunkel – percussion, drums
 Gary Ladinsky – engineer
 Charles Lloyd – saxophone
 Steve Love – bass
 David Lovelace – keyboards
 David Mansfield – organ, banjo, guitar, mandolin, percussion, violin, steel guitar
 Roger McGuinn – acoustic and electric guitar, arranger, vocals, producer
 Spooner Oldham – organ, piano
 Janis Oliver-Gill – backing vocals
 Kristine Oliver – backing vocals
 Jennifer O'Neill – backing vocals
 Mick Ronson – organ, guitar, percussion, piano, accordion, autoharp, recorder, vocals, producer
 Andrew Sandoval – liner notes
 Timothy B. Schmit – vocals
 Tom Scott – saxophone
 Leland Sklar – bass
 Rob Stoner – bass, percussion, vocals
 Greg Thomas – percussion, drums
 David Vaught – bass
 Rick Vito – Dobro, guitar, harmonica, vocals
 Mike Wooferd – keyboards
 Howie Wyeth – percussion, drums
 Risa Zaitschek – art direction

References 

Roger McGuinn albums
1991 compilation albums
Columbia Records compilation albums